Tauro Sport Auto is a Spanish manufacturer of luxury sports cars based in Valladolid, founded in 2010, when a group of Spanish businessmen joined with a British manufacturer of racing cars to create the company.

Their most popular model is the Tauro V8. It is based on the mechanical underpinnings i.e. chassis of the Pontiac Solstice and is powered by a Chevrolet-sourced powertrain as its base engine and is offered in four variants: Spider, Coupe, Saeta and Portago. The Spider is based on the Kappa platform, purchased from GM. New body styling and a range of big V-8 has replaced the turbocharged four cylinder, the interior design has now some modifications, upgraded in materials and given a variety of colors. The Tauro's core markets include the European Union, Russia, United Arab Emirates, China, and America.

History
In 2010, several Spanish businessmen, including Pedro J Santos, and a British manufacturer of racing cars joined together to create the company based in Valladolid.

They are produced in small series and made to order, with much of the manufacturing process done by hand.

Models
All models are called the Tauro V8. They were all powered by a Chevrolet LS3 engine.

 The Tauro V8 Spider is a traditional front engine, rear wheel drive roadster. 
 The Tauro V8 Coupé is the hardtop version.
 The Tauro V8 Saeta takes its name from the first jet plane made in Spain in the mid-twentieth century, the Hispano Aviación HA-200 Saeta and incorporates some of its design elements. 
 Tauro V8 Spider – Coupé – Saeta and Super Saeta were designed by Christopher Reitz, Ferdinand Porsche's great grandson.
 The Tauro V8 Portago is a Barchetta named after the Marquis, Portago, Spanish F1 gentleman driver who died in the 1957 Mille Miglia while driving for Ferrari.

See also 
 Sports car
 Supercar
 Hispano-Suiza
 Pegaso

References

External links

 Facebook Official Tauro Page
 Tauro's YouTube Channel
 

Car brands
Car manufacturers of Spain
Vehicle manufacturing companies established in 2010
Spanish brands
Sports car manufacturers
Luxury motor vehicle manufacturers